The 1986 Wichita State Shockers football team represented Wichita State University in the 1986 NCAA Division I-A football season. The Shockers competed as an independent program and played their home games at Cessna Stadium. It was the Shockers 90th and final season. The team, coached by Ron Chismar, went 3–8 and announced on December 2 that the team's 1986 season would be its last. University officials cited financial issues and lack of success as two of many factors leading to the program's termination. The 1970 plane crash involving the Shockers football team, in which only nine of 37 passengers survived, also played a role in the shuttering of the program.

Schedule

References

External Links
Hi-lites of Wichita State - Cincinnati Football Game

Wichita State
Wichita State Shockers football seasons
Wichita State Shockers football